A coccobacillus (plural coccobacilli), or bacilluscocco, is a type of bacterium with a shape intermediate between cocci (spherical bacteria) and bacilli (rod-shaped bacteria). Coccobacilli, then, are very short rods which may be mistaken for cocci.

Haemophilus influenzae, Gardnerella vaginalis, and Chlamydia trachomatis are coccobacilli. Aggregatibacter actinomycetemcomitans is a Gram-negative coccobacillus prevalent in subgingival plaques. Acinetobacter strains may grow on solid media as coccobacilli. Bordetella pertussis is a Gram-negative coccobacillus responsible for causing whooping cough. Yersinia pestis, the bacterium that causes  plague, is also coccobacillus.

Coxiella burnetii is also a coccobacillus. Bacteria from the genus Brucella are medically important coccobacilli that cause brucellosis.  Haemophilus ducreyi, another medically important Gram-negative coccobacillus, is observed in sexually transmitted disease, chancroid, of Third World countries.

References

Bacteria